Felix Großschartner (born 23 December 1993) is an Austrian cyclist, who currently rides for UCI WorldTeam .

Career
In 2016, he joined UCI Professional Continental team . With this team, he competed in his first Grand Tour: the 2017 Giro d'Italia.

Bora–Hansgrohe (2018–present)
In September 2017, Großschartner signed a contract to ride for the  team in the 2018 season. In April 2019, Großschartner took his first overall stage race victory at the Presidential Tour of Turkey, having won the summit finish to the ski resort south of Kartepe. In August 2019, he was named in the start list for the Vuelta a España. In August 2020, he was named in the start list for the Tour de France. He achieved his best result in a Grand Tour later that season, by finishing the Vuelta a España in ninth place overall.

In 2022, Großschartner took his first senior national championship titles, winning both the Austrian National Road Race Championships and the Austrian National Time Trial Championships.

Major results

2012
 1st Stage 1 (TTT) Tour of Szeklerland
2013
 10th Overall Circuit des Ardennes
 10th Overall Course de la Paix U23
2014
 3rd Overall Istrian Spring Trophy
 5th Trofeo Banca Popolare di Vicenza
2015
 1st Trofeo Banca Popolare di Vicenza
 1st  Mountains classification, Tour of Austria
 3rd Road race, National Under-23 Road Championships
 4th Raiffeisen Grand Prix
 5th Overall Oberösterreich Rundfahrt
 7th Giro del Belvedere
 8th Overall Rhône-Alpes Isère Tour
 8th Overall Giro della Regione Friuli Venezia Giulia
1st Stage 2
 9th Overall Istrian Spring Trophy
 10th GP Izola
2016
 4th Overall Tour of Croatia
 7th Overall Czech Cycling Tour
2017
 3rd Overall Tour of Austria
 4th Overall Tour of Croatia
 10th Overall Czech Cycling Tour
2018
 National Road Championships
2nd Road race
3rd Time trial
 2nd Overall Tour of Guangxi
 7th Grand Prix of Aargau Canton
 9th Overall Volta ao Algarve
 10th Overall Paris–Nice
 10th Trofeo Serra de Tramuntana
2019
 1st  Overall Tour of Turkey
1st Stage 5
 4th Overall Tour de Romandie
 4th Overall Czech Cycling Tour
 5th Overall Tour of Guangxi
 5th Overall Vuelta a San Juan
 8th Overall Tour of California
2020
 1st Stage 1 Vuelta a Burgos
 9th Overall Vuelta a España
 9th Overall Paris–Nice
2021
 1st Stage 5 Tour of the Alps
 4th Overall Settimana Ciclistica Italiana
 10th Overall Vuelta a España
2022
 National Road Championships
1st  Road race
1st  Time trial
 7th Overall Tour de Suisse
2023
 4th Overall Saudi Tour

General classification results timeline

References

External links

 Felix Großschartner at Bora–Hansgrohe 
 
 
 
 
 

1993 births
Living people
Austrian male cyclists
People from Wels
Sportspeople from Upper Austria